The Loch (also known as Loch Ness) is a six-part British television drama series, created by screenwriter Stephen Brady, that first broadcast on ITV on 11 June 2017. The series follows DS Annie Redford (Laura Fraser), a small town police officer with the Scottish Highland Police as she investigates the murder of piano teacher Niall Swift, who is found dead at the bottom of a cliff in the picturesque village of Lochnafoy, Loch Ness. When it becomes apparent that part of Swift's brain has been removed, and a human heart belonging to another victim is found close by, Annie's team realise they are searching for a serial killer. In response, Glasgow based major investigation detective DCI Lauren Quigley (Siobhan Finneran) is brought in to lead the enquiry.

Supporting cast includes Don Gilet as psychological profiler Blake Albrighton, John Sessions as Annie's boss DCI Frank Smilie, Gray O'Brien as Alan Redford, Annie's husband, and William Ash as local tourist operator Leighton Thomas. The series was filmed in the summer of 2016 and was shown in full in the Netherlands and Australia before its British broadcast. The Netherlands also released the series on DVD in May 2017, a month before the series premiered in the UK. In both countries, the series was aired under its original title of Loch Ness.

The series received mixed reviews, featuring a Metacritic score of 67 out of 100, indicating "generally favorable reviews". On another review aggregator website, Rotten Tomatoes, the series shows an average critic score of 64 per cent. It was released on DVD in the United Kingdom on 17 July 2017.

Cast

 Laura Fraser as DS Annie Redford
 Siobhan Finneran as DCI Lauren Quigley
 Don Gilet as Blake Albrighton
 John Sessions as DCI Frank Smilie
 Gray O'Brien as Alan Redford
 William Ash as Leighton Thomas
 Fraser James as Oliver Tench
 Alastair Mackenzie as Craig Petrie
 John Heffernan as Dr. Simon Marr
 Cherry Campbell as Isla Marr
 Jordan McCurrach as Niall Swift
 Keiran Gallacher as Jonjo Patterson
 Shona McHugh as Evie Redford
 Jack Bannon as Kieran Whitehead
 Oliver Greenall as Jordan Whitehead
 Simone Lahbib as Mhari Toner
 Euan Stamper as Crawford Baxter
 Conor McCarry as Dessie Toner
 George Anton as Don McGrellish
 Victoria Liddelle as Angusina McGrellish
 Ron Donachie as Iain Sutherland

Episodes

Broadcast 
The Loch aired on 11 June 2017 on ITV. Internationally, broadcast under the title Loch Ness, the series premiered in Australia on 20 April 2017 on BBC First and in the United States on 19 June 2017 on subscription streaming service Acorn TV. The series aired in October and November 2017 on CBC in Canada and 13 ulica in Poland. The series premiered in the Netherlands on 5 November 2017 on RTL 4.

References

External links

2017 British television series debuts
2017 British television series endings
2010s British crime television series
2010s British drama television series
2010s British television miniseries
English-language television shows
ITV television dramas
Television series about fictional serial killers
Television series by ITV Studios
Detective television series
Television shows set in Scotland
Loch Ness